Amani Mbedule (born 19 September 1996) is a Norwegian football forward.

Career
He made his debut for Trosvik IF in October 2012. In the 2014 3. divisjon he scored 12 goals in 23 league games. In the summer of 2015 he was brought to larger neighbours Sarpsborg 08 FF, and made his Eliteserien debut playing two matches in November 2015. He was sent on loan to IL Hødd in the spring of 2017, to Notodden FK in the autumn of 2017 and then in entire 2018. In 2019 he moved on to Kråkerøy IL, only to register another transfer to Lillehammer FK in the autumn of 2019.

Personal life
Born in Norway, Mbedule is of Tanzanian descent.

References

1996 births
Living people
Sportspeople from Fredrikstad
Norwegian footballers
Norwegian people of Tanzanian descent
Sarpsborg 08 FF players
IL Hødd players
Notodden FK players
Eliteserien players
Norwegian First Division players
Association football forwards